Vessel is the third studio album by Frankie Cosmos, the stage name of American singer-songwriter Greta Kline, released on March 30, 2018 on Sub Pop.

Critical reception

At Metacritic, which assigns a normalized rating out of 100 to reviews from mainstream critics, Vessel received an average score of 80, based on 12 reviews, which indicates "generally favorable reviews".

Track listing

Personnel
Adapted from the Frankie Cosmos bandcamp page.

 Greta Kline – guitar, vocals 
 David Maine – bass, vocals
 Lauren Martin – keys, vocals, second guitar
 Luke Pyenson – drums

Additional musicians
 Alex Bailey – second guitar 
 Anna McClellan – vocals 
 Vishal Narang – vocals

Charts

References

2018 albums
Frankie Cosmos albums
Sub Pop albums